The 1976 Arab League summit was held on October 16 in Riyadh, Saudi Arabia, as an extraordinary Arab League Summit. The summit came in the aftermath of the escalating civil war in Lebanon. It was attended only by representatives from Saudi Arabia, Egypt, Syria, Kuwait, Lebanon and the Palestinian Liberation Organization. The summit called for an end to the civil war and for the PLO to respect Lebanese sovereignty.

See also 
1976 Arab League summit (Cairo)

1976 in politics
1976 in international relations
1976 conferences
20th-century diplomatic conferences
20th century in Riyadh
1976 Arab League summit (Riyadh)
Lebanese Civil War
Middle East peace efforts
Diplomatic conferences in Saudi Arabia
October 1976 events in Asia